Saddle is an unincorporated community in eastern Fulton County, Arkansas, United States. The community is on the banks of South Fork Spring River.

References

Unincorporated communities in Fulton County, Arkansas
Unincorporated communities in Arkansas